The Confederation of Independent Trade Unions of Bosnia and Herzegovina is a trade union centre in Bosnia and Herzegovina. It was founded in 1905. ICTUR reports that "the SSSBiH is preoccupied primarily with the consequences of privatization and the high rate of unemployment and problems such as wage arrears."

The SSSBiH is affiliated with the International Trade Union Confederation.

References

Trade unions in Bosnia and Herzegovina
International Trade Union Confederation
1905 establishments in Bosnia and Herzegovina
Trade unions established in 1905